The premiership of Narendra Modi began on 26 May 2014 with his swearing-in as the prime minister of India at the Rashtrapati Bhavan. He became the 14th Prime Minister of India, succeeding Manmohan Singh of the Indian National Congress. Modi's first cabinet consisted of 45 ministers, 25 fewer than the previous United Progressive Alliance government. 21 ministers were added to the council of ministers on 9 November 2014.

In 2019, he was elected as the prime minister of India for the second time and sworn in at the Rashtrapati Bhavan on 30 May 2019. His second cabinet consisted of 54 ministers and initially had 51 ministers, which was expanded to 77 ministers during a reshuffle on 7 July 2021. His premiership has, to a considerable extent, practiced high command culture.

Under Modi's premiership, India has experienced democratic backsliding.

Economic policies

Overall

The economic policies of Modi's government focused on privatization and liberalization of the economy, based on a neoliberal framework. Modi liberalized India's foreign direct investment policies, allowing more foreign investment in several industries, including in defense and the railways. Other reforms included removing many of the country's labor laws. Some scholars alleged government on remodeling labour reform and said labour reforms were made to make it harder for workers to form unions and easier for employers to hire and fire them.  These reforms met with support from institutions such as the World Bank, but opposition from some scholars within the country. The labor laws also drew strong opposition from unions: on 2 September 2015, eleven of the country's largest unions went on strike, including one affiliated with the BJP. The Bharatiya Mazdoor Sangh, a constituent of the Sangh Parihar, stated that the reforms would hurt laborers by making it easier for corporations to exploit them.

In his first budget, Finance Minister Arun Jaitley promised to gradually reduce the budgetary deficit from 4.1% to 3% over two years and to divest from shares in public banks. Over Modi's first year in office, the Indian GDP grew at a rate of 7.5%, making it the fastest-growing economy in the world. For this the basis was a revised formula introduced a year after he took office, which surprised a lot of economists. However, this rate of growth had fallen significantly to 6.1%, by his third year in office. This fall has been blamed on the exercise of demonetisation of currency.

In July 2014, Modi refused to sign a trade agreement that would permit the World Trade Organization to implement a deal agreed in Bali, citing that agreement will lead to "lack of protection to Indian farmers and the needs of food security" and "Lack of bargaining power". The addition to Indian airports grew by 23 percent in 2016 while the airfares dropped by over 25 percent.

In September 2014, Modi introduced the Make in India initiative to encourage foreign companies to manufacture products in India, with the goal of turning India into a global manufacturing hub. Supporters of economic liberalisation supported the initiative, while critics argued it would allow foreign corporations to capture a greater share of the Indian market. "Make in India" had three stated objectives:

 to increase the manufacturing sector's growth rate to 12-14% per annum
 to create 100 million additional manufacturing jobs in the economy by 2022
 to ensure that the manufacturing sector's contribution to GDP is increased to 25% by 2022 (later revised to 2025).

The Government has increased the Budget for National Mission for Green India from Rs.290 Crore($38,511,333.00 in USD) to 361.69 Crore($48,034,782.98 in USD).  The public expenditure on education including technical education as a percentage of GDP for the year 2013-2014 was 4.44% which was later reduced to 4.35% in the year 2014-2015 and was later increased to 4.56% in the year 2015-2016 by Modi Government. The public health expenditure as a percentage of GDP of the country was 1.3% in 2013-14 was reduced by Modi Government to 1.2% and in the year 2016-17 was increased to 1.5%. In October 2014, the Modi government deregulated diesel prices, and later increased taxes on diesel and petrol by Rs 13 and Rs 11 between June 2014 and January 2016 on petrol and diesel respectively. Later, taxes were decreased by four rupees(Rs 4) between February 2016 and October 2018 for petrol and diesel. Similarly, during January–April 2020, following a sharp decline of 69% in the global crude oil prices, the central government increased the excise duty on petrol and diesel by Rs 10 per litre and Rs 13 per litre, respectively in May 2020. Because of these subsequent changes in taxes the retail selling prices remained stable in India during the period of fall and increase in prices of global crude oil.

In order to enable the construction of defence and industrial corridors, the Modi administration amend the 2013 Act of land-reform bill that allowed it to acquire private land and without the consent of the owners for "only" these five types of projects (i) defence, (ii) rural infrastructure, (iii) affordable housing, (iv) industrial corridors set up by the government/government undertakings, up to one km on either side of the road/railway of the corridor, and (v) infrastructure including PPP projects where the government owns the land. Under the previous bill(Land Acquisition Act, 2013), the government required 0% consent of landowners for Public Projects of any category, 70% consent of landowners for Public-Private projects and 80% consent for Private Projects. According to the new bill, The government must conduct a survey of its wasteland and maintain a record of the same. The bill was passed via an executive order after it faced opposition in parliament but was eventually allowed to lapse.

The government substantially increased the percentage of central revenue directly granted to states, while decreasing the amount granted through various central government programs. Overall, states' share of revenue increased marginally. The criteria upon which individual states' allocation was determined were changed, such that the revenue to 19 states increased, and that of 10 states decreased. Only one of the ten states was ruled by the BJP when the policy was enacted.

The government signed large deals with General Electric and Alstom to supply India with 1,000 new diesel locomotives, as part of an effort to reform the Indian railway, which also included privatisation efforts. In December 2015, Modi's government signed an agreement with Japan to jointly build a bullet train system linking Mumbai and Ahmedabad. The Indian government put forward a plan on converting 101 rivers into national waterways for the transport of goods and passengers. The government also began an ambitious program to increase the number of highways in the country, allocating  to the project.

On 25 June 2015, Modi launched a program intended to develop 100 smart cities. He also launched a "smart villages" initiative, under which villages would be given Internet access, clean water, sanitation, and low-carbon energy, with Members of Parliament overseeing the program's implementation. The program had a stated goal of at least 2,500 smart villages by 2019.

Give up LPG subsidy is a campaign launched in March 2015 by the Indian government led by Narendra Modi. It is aimed at motivating LPG users who can afford to pay the market price for LPG to voluntarily surrender their LPG subsidy. As at 23 April 2016 1 crore ( 10 million) people had voluntarily given up the subsidy.
The surrendered subsidy is being used by the government to provide cooking gas connections to poor families in rural households free of cost. Maharashtra, Uttar Pradesh, Karnataka, Delhi and Tamil Nadu are the top five states to give up the subsidy.

Under his government, Railway budget was merged into the Union Budget of India. The date of presenting the budget was moved from 28 to 1 February and the financial cycle was changed from July to April. Further, the artificial distinction between planned and non-planned expenditure was removed. Foreign Investment Promotion Board (FIPB), considered as a hurdle in FDI, was scrapped by the Modi government.

In 2017, Modi government put in place the Goods and Services Tax, the biggest tax reform in the country since independence. It subsumed around 17 different taxes and became effective from 1 July 2017.

Over the first four years of Modi's premiership, India's GDP grew at an average rate of 7.23%, higher than the rate of 6.39% under the previous government. The level of income inequality increased, while an internal government report said that in 2017, unemployment had increased to its highest level in 45 years. The loss of jobs was attributed to the 2016 demonetisation, and to the effects of the Goods and Services Tax. The last year of Modi's first term didn't see much economic development and focused on the policies of Defence and on the basic formula of Hindutva. His government focused on pension facilities for old-age group people and depressed sections of society. The economic growth rate in 2018-19 was recorded to be 6.1%, which was lower than the average rate of the first four years of premiership. The fall in the growth rate was again attributed to the 2016 demonetisation and to the effects of the GST on the economy. In the year 2020, due to the nationwide lockdown and shutdown of the industries, the Indian economy suffered a major economic loss. It experienced a historic fall of -23% rate of the GDP, following which, Prime Minister Modi launched a movement called Atmanirbhar Bharat along with other movements and schemes to support the small scale and indigenous businesses to support the economy and to boycott Chinese products.

Financial inclusion
Modi launched Pradhan Mantri Jan Dhan Yojana (PMJDY) in August 2014. After the launch, 125.4 million accounts were opened by January 2015.

Modi government launched the Pradhan Mantri Mudra Yojana (PMMY) in April 2015. According to a report by the SKOCH Group, this scheme has generated 1.68 crore incremental jobs in the first two years until September 2017.

Anti-corruption initiatives
In his first cabinet decision, Modi set up a team to investigate black money.
Over the first four years of Modi's premiership, India's GDP grew at an average rate of 7.23%, higher than the rate of 6.39% under the previous government. The level of income inequality increased, while an internal government report said that in 2017, unemployment had increased to its highest level in 45 years. The loss of jobs was attributed to the 2016 demonetisation, and to the effects of the Goods and Services Tax.

Demonetisation

Shell companies 

After demonetisation of ₹500 and ₹1000 rupee notes various authorities noticed a surge in shell companies depositing cash in banks, possibly in an attempt to hide the real owner of the wealth. In response, in July 2017, the authorities ordered nearly 200,000 shell companies to be shut down while Securities and Exchange Board of India (SEBI) imposed trading restrictions on 162 listed entities as shell companies. In September 2017, the government froze bank accounts of nearly 200,000 shell companies. A day after, the Corporate Affairs ministry decided to ban around 300,000 directors of shell companies from serving on the boards of other firms to track down the beneficial owners of suspected shell companies and take penal action against those who divert funds from these shell companies.

Infrastructure
Modi government passed the National Waterways Act, 2016 to develop 111 National Waterways in India.

Housing 
in June, 2015 under his premiership MoHUA started PM Awas Yojana with an aim to provide affordable Houses by giving financial assistance. Under PMAY, it is proposed to build 2 crore houses for poor including Economically Weaker Sections and Low Income Groups by the year 2022 through a financial assistance of ₹2 lakh crore (US$25 billion) from the central government.

Privatization of government owned assets

Banks
On 27 March 2022 Bank employees called a nationwide strike for two days to protest against the Modi government's plan to privatize public sector banks.

Secularism and social policies

Hindutva
During the 2014 election campaign, Modi expressed hopes for a tenure without communal violence. The BJP sought to identify itself with political leaders known to have opposed Hindu nationalism, including B. R. Ambedkar, Subhas Chandra Bose, and Ram Manohar Lohia. The campaign also saw the use of rhetoric based on Hindutva, however, by BJP leaders in certain states. Communal tensions were played upon especially in Uttar Pradesh and the states of Northeast India. A proposal for the controversial Uniform Civil Code was a part of the BJP's election manifesto.

Several state governments headed by the BJP have enacted policies aligned with Hindutva after the election of Modi as prime minister. The government of Haryana made changes to its education policy that introduced Hindu religious elements into the curriculum. External affairs minister Sushma Swaraj suggested after the election that the Bhagvad Gita be adopted as India's "national book". The Modi administration has generally avoided directly supporting policies related to a Hindutva agenda. There has been an increase in the activities of a number of other Hindu nationalist organisations, sometimes with the support of the government. The incidents included a campaign against "Love Jihad", a religious conversion programme, by members of the right wing Hindu Mahasabha. The attempts at religious conversion have been described by the VHP and other organisations involved with them as attempts at "reconversion" from Islam or Christianity. However, no evidence was found by police in many states to support the "love-jihad" narrative. There have been a number of reports of intimidation or coercion of the subjects during these attempts. Officials in the government, including the Home Minister, have defended the attempts. There were additional incidents of violence targeted at religious minorities by Hindu nationalists. Modi refused to remove a government minister from her position after a popular outcry resulted from her referring to religious minorities as "bastards". Commentators have suggested, however, that the violence was perpetrated by radical Hindu nationalists to undercut the authority of Modi.

The Modi administration appointed Yellapragada Sudershan Rao, who had previously been associated with the RSS, chairperson of the Indian Council of Historical Research. In reaction to his appointment, other historians and former members of the ICHR, including those sympathetic to the ruling party, questioned his credentials as a historian. Several stated that the appointment was part of an agenda of cultural nationalism.

On 8 January 2019, India's lower house of parliament approves a bill that would grant residency and citizenship rights to non-Muslim immigrants who entered the country before 2014 - including Hindus, Sikhs, Buddhists, Jains, Parsis and Christians from three Muslim-majority countries (Bangladesh, Pakistan and Afghanistan) - and make them eligible for Indian citizenship. The Bill excludes Muslims. 

On 6 August 2019, the Supreme Court of India passed resolution on creation of Ram Mandir on the disputed land of Ayodhya. The verdict also stated to provide  for creation of a mosque on another part of the land. The land was given to the Sunni Waqf Board. On 5 August 2019, Narendra Modi held the Bhoomipujan at the Ayodhya. He became the first prime minister to visit Ram Janmabhoomi and Hanuman Garhi.

On 8 March 2019, the Kashi Vishwanath Corridor Project was launched by Narendra Modi to ease access between the temple and the Ganges River, creating a wider space to prevent overcrowding. On 13 December 2021, Modi inaugurated the corridor with a sacred ceremony.

Under Modi's tenure, bulldozers have been used in many Muslim neighborhoods for demolitions of homes, shops and other property owned by Muslims accused in crimes or riots. BJP officials have defended the use of demolitions as they say properties are illegal. In Delhi, the demolition drive even violated the Supreme Court order which asked the authorities to immediately stop the demolitions.

Social welfare
In June 2015, Modi launched the "Housing for All By 2022" project, which intends to eliminate slums in India by building about 20 million affordable homes for India's urban poor. A total of 4,718 camps were held from 2014 to 2017, benefiting 6.40 lakh beneficiaries under Assistance to Disabled Persons for Purchase/Fitting of Aids/Appliances (ADIP) scheme, as compared to 37 camps from 2012 to 2014.

In 2019, a law was passed to provide 10% reservation to Economically weaker sections.

Modi also launched Pradhan Mantri Ujjwala Yojana (PMUY) on 1 May 2016 to distribute 50 million LPG connections to women of BPL families. In the first year of its launch, the connections distributed were 22 million against the target of 15 million. As of 23 October 2017, 30 million connections were distributed, 44% of which were given to families belonging to scheduled castes and scheduled tribes. The number crossed 58 million by December 2018. In 2018 Union Budget of India, its scope was widened to include 80 million poor households. 21,000 awareness camps were conducted by oil marketing companies (OMC). The scheme led to an increase in LPG consumption by 56% in 2019 as compared to 2014.

The Muslim Women Bill, 2017

The BJP Government formulated the bill after 100 cases of instant triple talaq in the country since the Supreme Court judgement in August 2017. On 28 December 2017, Lok Sabha passed The Muslim Women (Protection of Rights on Marriage) Bill, 2017. The bill make instant triple talaq (talaq-e-biddah) in any form — spoken, in writing or by electronic means such as email, SMS and WhatsApp illegal and void, with up to three years in jail for the husband. MPs from RJD, AIMIM, BJD, AIADMK and AIML opposed the bill, calling it arbitrary in nature and a faulty proposal, while Congress supported the Bill tabled in Lok Sabha by law minister Ravi Shankar Prasad. 19 amendments were moved in Lok Sabha but all were rejected.
 
The central government re-introduced the bill in the Lok Sabha on 21 June 2019. The bill was subsequently passed by the Lok Sabha on 25 July 2019 and then by Rajya Sabha on 30 July 2019 and received assent from President Kovind on 31 July 2019. After its enactment, the Act became retrospectively effective from 19 September 2018.

However, even after five years since Supreme Court’s invalidation of triple talaq, the women petitioners who were abandoned by their husbands, continue to live the life of half-divorcees.

Health and sanitation policies 

In his first year as prime minister Modi reduced the amount of money spent by the government on healthcare. The Modi government launched a "New Health Policy" in January 2015. The policy did not increase the government's spending on healthcare, but placed emphasis on the role of private healthcare organisations. In its budget for the second year after it took office, the Modi government reduced healthcare spending by 15%. This represented a shift away from the policy of the previous Congress government, which had supported programs to support public health goals including reducing child and maternal mortality rates. The National Health Mission, which included public health programs targeted at these indices received nearly 25% less funds in 2015 than in the previous year. 15 national health programs, including those aimed at controlling tobacco use and supporting healthcare for the elderly, were merged with the National Health Mission, and received less funds than in previous years. Modi initially appointed Harsh Vardhan, a doctor and an advocate of tobacco control, minister of health. However, Vardhan was removed in November 2015. The government also proposed introducing stricter packaging laws for tobacco, but this effort was postponed because of the efforts of the tobacco lobby.

On 2 October 2014, Modi launched the Swachh Bharat Abhiyan ("Clean India") campaign. The stated goals of the campaign included eliminating open defecation, eliminating manual scavenging, and improving waste management practices. The campaign was announced on the anniversary of Mahatma Gandhi's birthday, and was planned to achieve these aims in five years, or in time for the 150th anniversary of his birth. As part of the programme, the Indian government began the construction of millions toilets in rural areas, as well as efforts to encourage people to use them. The government also announced plans to build new sewage treatment plants. The administration plans to construct 60 million toilets by 2019. The construction projects have faced allegations of corruption, and have faced severe difficulty in getting people to use the toilets constructed for them. Modi has generally emphasized his government's efforts at sanitation as a means of ensuring good health. He has also advocated yoga and traditional forms of medicine. An article in the medical journal Lancet stated that the country "might have taken a few steps back in public health" under Modi.

Modi's government developed a draft policy to introduce a universal health care system, known as the National Health Assurance Mission. Under this plan, the government was to provide free drugs, diagnostic treatment, and insurance coverage for serious ailments, although budgetary concerns have delayed its implementation. The government announced "Ayushman Bharat" (National Health Protection Mission) in the 2018 Union Budget of India. It is World's largest health protection scheme, also being called ModiCare. The scheme will help 10 crore families in their medical need. Under the Ayushman Bharat programme, there is a new scheme has been announced by Arun Jaitley, the finance minister of India, called National Health Protection Scheme, providing a health insurance cover of ₹5 lac a family per annum. More than a lakh people have taken benefit of the scheme till October 2018.

Education and skill development

Pradhan Mantri Kaushal Vikas Yojana (PMKVY), a skill development initiative scheme of the Government of India for recognition and standardisation of skills. The scheme has a target to train 1 crore Indian youth from 2016 to 2020. As of 18 July 2016, 17.93 lakh candidates were trained out of 18 lakh who enrolled for the scheme. The aim of the PMKVY scheme is to encourage aptitude towards employable skills and to increase working efficiency of probable and existing daily wage earners, by giving monetary awards and rewards and by providing quality training to them. Those wage earners already possessing a standard level of skill will be given recognition as per scheme and average award amount for them is ₹2000 to ₹2500. In the initial year, a target to distribute  has been laid down for the scheme. Training programmes have been worked out on the basis of National Occupational Standards (NOS) and qualification packs specifically developed in various sectors of skills. For this qualification plans and quality plans have been developed by various Sector Skill Councils (SSC) created with participation of Industries. National Skill Development Corporation (NSDC) has been made coordinating and driving agency for the same.

An outlay of  has been approved by the cabinet for this project. The scheme has a target to train 1 crore Indian youth from 2016 to 2020. As of 18 July 2016, 17.93 lakh candidates were trained out of 18 lakh who enrolled for the scheme.

The government began formulating a New Education Policy, or NEP, soon after its election. This was the third education policy introduced by the Indian government, following those of 1968 and 1986. The policy was described as having overtones of Hindutva. The RSS had a role in its creation, and it did not explicitly mention the goals of "socialism, secularism and democracy" that had been mentioned in the first two policies. The policy emphasised the education of minority students, as well as those of economically backward groups, in particular on improving enrolment in schools among those groups. The policy proposed bringing religious educational institutions under the Right to Education Act. There was also a debate about removing caste-based reservation in favour of reservation based on income, a move supported by the RSS, but which was criticised as being discriminatory on the basis of caste. As of October 2018, the new policy had not been implemented.

In July 2020, the government unveiled the National Education Policy 2020, "envisioning an India-centric education system that contributes directly to transforming our nation sustainably into an equitable and vibrant knowledge society by providing high-quality education to all"  and making "India a global knowledge superpower".

Foreign policy 

Foreign policy played a relatively small role in Modi's election campaign, and did not feature prominently in the BJP's election manifesto. Modi invited all the other leaders of SAARC countries to the ceremony where he was sworn in as prime minister. He was the first Indian prime minister to do so. Observers have stated that due to Modi portraying himself as a strong and nationalist leader during his election campaign, he would be politically unable to follow a policy of restraint that India had previously followed after terrorist attacks, and is more likely to have a military response.

Modi's foreign policy focused on improving economic ties, improving security, and increased regional relations, which is very similar to the policy of the preceding INC government. Modi continued his predecessor Manmohan Singh's policy of "multialignment." This involved the use of regional multilateral institutions and strategic partnerships to further the interests of the Indian government. The Modi administration tried to attract foreign investment in the Indian economy from several sources, especially in East Asia. The Modi government also upgraded several of India's military alliances, although it was unable to conclude negotiations for a trilateral defense agreement with Japan and Australia. As a part of this policy, the Modi government completed India's application to join the Shanghai Cooperation Organisation, which is led by China and Russia. (SCO). It also joined the Asian Infrastructure Investment Bank founded by China. Together with the US government, it created a "Joint Strategic Vision" for the Indian and Pacific oceans. The government also tried to improve relations with Islamic republics in the Middle East, such as Bahrain, the Islamic Republic of Iran, Saudi Arabia, and the United Arab Emirates, as well as with Israel, with the intent to also "link west." Modi added five bilateral strategic partnerships to the 25 that had been agreed by his predecessors Singh and Vajpayee.

During the first few months after the election, Modi made trips to a number of different countries to further the goals of his policy, and attended the BRICS, ASEAN, and G20 summits. During these visits, Modi attempted to draw further foreign investment in the Indian economy, with the use of slogans such as "Make in India" and "Digital India," put forward during a visit to Silicon Valley. One of Modi's first visits as prime minister was to Nepal, during which he promised a billion USD in aid. Another early visit was to Bhutan. IModi also made several overtures to the United States, including multiple visits to that country. While this was described as an unexpected development, due to the US having previously denied Modi a travel visa over his role during the 2002 Gujarat riots, it was also expected to strengthen diplomatic and trade relations between the two countries. As of July 2016, Modi had made 51 trips to 42 countries with the intent of strengthening diplomatic relations.

In 2015, the Indian parliament ratified a land exchange deal with Bangladesh about the India–Bangladesh enclaves, which had been initiated by the government of Manmohan Singh. Modi's administration gave renewed attention to India's "Look East Policy", instituted in 1991. The policy was renamed the "Act East Policy", and involved directing Indian foreign policy towards East Asia and Southeast Asia. The government signed agreements to improve land connectivity with Myanmar, through the state of Manipur. This represented a break with India's historic engagement with Myanmar, which prioritized border security over trade.

He coined the concept of "three Ds" — democracy, demography and demand — to reflect the strength of the country.

Defence policy 

During the 2014 election campaign, Modi and the BJP pledged to revisit India's nuclear weapons doctrine, and in particular India's historical policy of no-first-use. The pressure to revise the doctrine came from a desire for assertiveness among Indian government and defence officials. Soon after being sworn in as Prime Minister, Modi said that no revision would take place in the immediate future. The election manifesto of the BJP had also promised to deal with illegal immigration into India in the Northeast, as well as to be more firm in its handling of insurgent groups. During the election campaign, Modi said that he would be willing to accommodate Hindu migrants who were being persecuted in Bangladesh, but those that came with "political objectives" would have to be sent back to Bangladesh. The Modi government issued a notification allowing Hindu, Sikh, and Buddhist illegal immigrants from Pakistan and Bangladesh to legalize their residency in India. The government described the measure as being taken for humanitarian reasons. However, it drew criticism from several Assamese organizations.

Modi continued the previous INC administration's policy of increasing military spending every year, announcing an increase of 11% in the military budget in 2015. This increase was larger than the average growth under the Congress.

The Modi administration negotiated a peace agreement with the largest faction of the National Socialist Council of Nagaland (NSCM), which was announced in August 2015. The Naga insurgency in northwest India had begun in the 1950s. The NSCM and the government had agreed to a ceasefire in 1997, but a peace accord had not previously been signed. In 2015 the government abrogated a 15-year ceasefire with the Khaplang faction of the NSCM (NSCM-K). The NSCM-K responded with a series of attacks, which killed 18 people. The Modi government carried out a raid across the border with Myanmar as a result, and labelled the NSCM-K a terrorist organization.

Modi has repeatedly stated that Pakistan was an exporter of terrorism. Modi increased the monetary compensation for victims of terrorist attacks, and stated that citizens of Azad Kashmir could also apply for this compensation. In September 2016, he urged the BRICS to target and destroy funding channels of terrorist groups. On 29 September 2016, the Indian Army stated that it had conducted a surgical strike on terror launchpads in PoK, Pakistan denied the claims, while details of the confrontation were later released by the Indian Army. Video footages were released of the confrontations.

Modi also played a crucial role and known for involving in 2017 China–India border standoff at the Doklam making the Defence policy strict against China and also strengthening relations with Bhutan.

The Modi administration has been active in the Defence policy, he has a major concern and soon on 14 February 2019, a convoy of vehicles carrying security personnel on the Jammu Srinagar National Highway was attacked by a vehicle-borne suicide bomber at Lethpora in the Pulwama district, Jammu and Kashmir, India. The attack resulted in the deaths of 46 Central Reserve Police Force personnel and the attacker. The perpetrator of the attack was from Indian-administered Kashmir. The responsibility for the attack was claimed by the Pakistan-based Islamistterrorist group Jaish-e-Mohammed. On 26 February, twelve Mirage 2000 jets of the Indian Air Force crossed the Line of Control and dropped bombs into Balakot, Pakistan. India claimed that it attacked a Jaish-e-Mohammed training camp and killed a large number of terrorists, reported to be between 300 and 350. Pakistan claimed that they quickly scrambled jets to intercept the IAF jets, who dropped their payloads to quickly return over the Line of Control.

After the 2019 Lok Sabha election win, he made serious and strict defence policy against China and Pakistan.

Following Galwan valley skirmishes, there were made serious policies against China. On 17 June 2020, Modi addressed the nation regarding the Galwan skirmish, giving a firm message directed at China over the deaths of Indian soldiers. The first communication since the start of the border dispute between the foreign ministers of China, Wang Yi and of India, S Jaishankar also happened after the Galwan skirmish. S Jaishankar accused the Chinese actions in Galwan to be "pre-meditated and planned".

Environmental policies

In naming his cabinet, Modi renamed the "Ministry of Environment and Forests" the "Ministry of Environment, Forests, and Climate Change." In the first budget of the government, the money allotted to this ministry was reduced by more than 50%. The new ministry also removed or diluted a number of laws related to environmental protection. These included no longer requiring clearance from the National Board for Wildlife for projects close to protected areas, and allowing certain projects to proceed before environmental clearance was received. The government also tried to reconstitute the Wildlife board such that it no longer had representatives from non-governmental organisations: however, this move was prevented by the Supreme court.

Modi also relaxed or abolished a number of other environmental regulations, particularly those related to industrial activity. A government committee stated that the existing system only served to create corruption and that the government should instead rely on the owners of industries to voluntarily inform the government about the pollution they were creating. The changes were made with the aim of accelerating approval for industrial projects. Other changes included reducing ministry oversight on small mining projects, and no longer requiring approval from tribal councils for projects inside forested areas. In addition, Modi lifted a moratorium on new industrial activity in the most polluted areas in the countries. The changes were welcomed by business people but were criticized by environmentalists.

Under the UPA government that preceded Modi's administration, field trials of Genetically Modified crops had essentially put on hold, after protests from farmers fearing for their livelihoods. Under the Modi government these restrictions were gradually lifted. The government received some criticism for freezing the bank accounts of environmental group Greenpeace, citing financial irregularities, although a leaked government report said that the freeze had to do with Greenpeace's opposition to GM crops.

At the CoP21 Climate Conference on 30 November 2015 Modi announced the founding of an International Solar Alliance (ISA). The headquarters of the ISA would be located in Gurgaon, and would receive support from the Indian government for a few years. All tropical countries were invited to join the alliance.
He was also awarded the United Nations Champions of the Earth award in 2018 for his environmental policies.

In 2022, India was placed at the bottom of the  Environmental Performance Index (EPI) getting the lowest rank among 180 countries.

Governance and other initiatives

Modi's first year as prime minister saw significant centralisation of power relative to previous administrations. Modi personally selected the civil servants who served under his ministers, frequently giving them instructions without involving the ministers themselves. Modi's efforts at centralisation have been linked to an increase in the number of senior administration officials resigning their positions. Although the government has a majority of seats in the Lok Sabha, it does not have one in the Rajya Sabha, which led to its policies frequently being stymied there. Thus, Modi resorted to passing a number of ordinances, or executive orders, to enact his policies, leading to further centralisation of power. In 2014, the Prime Minister's Office prevented Gopal Subramaniam from being appointed to the Supreme Court. The stated reason was that his conduct in the 2G spectrum allocation case had been suspect: commentators stated it was because he had been the amicus curiae in the Sohrabuddin Sheikh case, which had implicated BJP leaders including Modi's aide Amit Shah. The government also passed a bill increasing the control that it had over the appointment of judges, and reducing that of the judiciary.

On 31 December 2014, Modi announced that the Planning Commission had been scrapped. It was replaced with a body called the National Institution for Transforming India, or NITI Aayog. The Planning Commission was a legacy of the Indian Independence movement, although critics said that it was slowing economic growth. The new body includes the leaders of all 29 Indian states, but its full-time staff report directly to the prime minister. The move had the effect of greatly centralising the power previously with the planning commission in the person of the prime minister. It also reduced the extent of control individual states had over their financial allocation from the union government, and unlike the planning commission, it does not have the power to allocate funds. The planning commission had received heavy criticism in previous years for creating inefficiency in the government, and of not filling its role of improving social welfare: however, since the economic liberalisation of the 1990s, it had been the major government body responsible for measures related to social justice.

As Prime Minister, Modi announced the abolition of a number of regulations previously placed on Indian businesses, such as a complex permit and inspection system. The move was aimed at reducing red tape and making it easier to do business. Modi also ordered reform among the bureaucrats of the Indian Administrative Service to ensure a more efficient government bureaucracy.

The Modi government launched a crackdown against a number of civil society organisations. Several tens of thousands of organisations were investigated by the Intelligence Bureau in the first year of the administration, on the grounds that they were slowing economic growth. International humanitarian aid organisation Medecins Sans Frontieres was among the groups that were put under pressure. Other organisations affected included the Sierra Club and Avaaz. Cases of sedition were filed against individuals criticising the government. This led to discontent with Modi's style of functioning within the BJP, and drew comparisons to the governing style of Indira Gandhi. 

Modi government has exploited the terrorism prevention law UAPA to intimidate and imprison critics and activists.  

He started a monthly radio program titled "Mann ki Baat" on 3 October 2014.

Repealing obsolete laws

Modi repealed 1,200 obsolete laws in first three years as prime minister, against a total of 1,301 such laws repealed by previous governments over a span of 64 years. The legislations passed in the parliament for the purpose include Repealing and Amending Act, 2015, Repealing and Amending (Second) Act, 2015, Repealing and Amending Act, 2016, Repealing and Amending Act, 2017 and Repealing and Amending (Second) Act, 2017.

IT policy
Modi launched the Digital India programme, which has the goal of ensuring that government services are available electronically, building infrastructure so rural areas get high-speed Internet access, boosting manufacturing of electronic goods in the country, and promoting digital literacy. Under the programme, 400 railway Stations across the country are being equipped with Wi-Fi technology. In the 2017 Union Budget of India, POS machines, scanners, fingerprint readers, iris scanners and micro ATMs were exempted from all kinds of custom duties. The internet penetration in India rose from 20 percent in 2014 to 28.7 percent in 2016.

Partnerships
"Unnat Bharat Abhiyan" involve engaging with neighbouring communities and using technologies for their upliftment.

Democratic backsliding

Under Modi's premiership, India has experienced democratic backsliding.

Since Modi became prime minister in 2014, India has seen a decline in press freedom, falling from 133 out of 180 countries in 2016 to 150 in 2021, in the Press Freedom Index published by Reporters Without Borders.

India ranked 46th out of 165 independent countries and two territories in the Democracy Index published by the Economist Intelligence Unit (EIU) for 2021.

Use of investigative agencies
Central investigative agencies like the Enforcement Directorate and the Central Bureau of Investigation have been instrumentalised for political gains by the Modi government and used against their political opposition. The government has put opposition politicians under house arrest and jailed them in order to prevent them from canvassing or participating in protest movements such as in the cases of TDP politician Nara Lokesh and former finance minister P. Chidambaram. Jaffrelot finds similarities between the way the Modi administration has used investigative agencies, and the use of income-tax raids as a tool of intimidation by the government of Indira Gandhi during the emergency. A pattern of closing cases against political opponents who defect to the ruling Bharatiya Janata Party has also emerged. The charges of Sharda scam were dropped against Himanta Biswa Sarma when he joined the BJP, cases against Ajit Pawar, Mukul Roy, Y.S. Chowdary and Harshvardhan Patil were also dropped when they defected to the BJP.

According to the data shared by the Union government in the parliament in July 2022, the Enforcement Directorate (ED) has registered 5,422 cases under the Prevention of Money Laundering Act, 2002, but only 23 persons have been convicted – less than 0.5% out of which 5,310 cases were under the premiership of Narendra Modi. The government data on convictions by the Income Tax Department is also abysmal. In 6 months between 2018 and 2019, the Income Tax Department had raided the offices of 16 politicians of which 15 belonged to opposition parties. Among the politicians booked, arrested, raided or questioned by the Central Bureau of Investigation under the first eight years years of Modi's government, 95% were from the opposition. BJP leaders have boasted about the impunity they get from the investigative agencies and threatening rebels in their party with raids, adds further to the allegations of misuse of investigative agencies under the premiership of Modi.

Suppression of data
Modi's government delayed the release of data on unemployment in 2019. Two members of National Statistical Commission resigned in protest as the release was approved in December 2018 by the commission. The government released the data in May 2019 after the general elections. The government delayed farmer suicide data from 2016 by three years. Before the 2019 general elections, the government did not release data on consumer expenditure, GDP growth, deaths due to lynching, and caste census from 2011.

The government withheld National Crime Records Bureau data for 2017., discontinued Labour Bureau’s quarterly enterprises survey and the Employment-Unemployment Survey, and instead plan to rely on provident fund data for calculation of unemployment, which is widely criticized.

COVID-19 pandemic

During the second wave of the pandemic in April 2021, Modi's government launched a new policy for vaccines which allowed Serum Institute of India and Bharat Biotech to earn huge profit margins making vaccine doses distributed by the private hospitals unaffordable for working class families in India. The requirement to book the vaccination slots online excluded many Indians who did not have smartphones or internet access.

During the COVID-19 pandemic, many estimates, including by The Lancet and World Health Organization, say India undercounted number of deaths, ranging from a factor of 5 to 10 times.

On January 30, 2022, India announced that it administered about 1.7 billion doses of vaccines and more than 720 million people were fully vaccinated.

According to a 2022 study published in The Lancet Infectious Diseases journal, over 4.2 million lives were saved in India in 2021 due to vaccination against Covid-19.

See also 
 Indian Government
 Bhartiya Janta Party
 Second Modi ministry
 2019 Indian general election
 List of international prime ministerial trips made by Narendra Modi

References

Citations

Sources

External links

Narendra Modi
Indian premierships
Modi administration
Authoritarianism
Cults of personality